NGC 415 is a spiral galaxy of type SB(rb)b located in the constellation Sculptor. It was discovered on September 1, 1834 by John Herschel. It was described by Dreyer as "very faint, small, round, gradually a little brighter middle."

References

External links
 

0415
18340901
Sculptor (constellation)
Barred spiral galaxies
004161